Peter Kaufmann or Peter Kaufman may refer to:

 Peter Kaufmann (sculptor) (1764-1829), Austrian-born German sculptor
 Peter Kaufmann (Alpine guide) (1858-1924), Swiss mountain guide
 Peter Kaufmann (politician) (born 1947), businessman and former municipal politician in Winnipeg, Manitoba, Canada
 Peter Kaufmann (philosopher), American philosopher
Peter Iver Kaufman, American philosopher
 Peter S. Kaufman, American investment banker